An Thanh Le, (Vietnamese: Lê Thành Ân), born 1954, previously served as the Consul General for the US in Ho Chi Minh City, Vietnam, followed by Rena Bitter.

Born in Vietnam and was adopted by an American diplomat in France. Le moved with his adopted family back to the United States and settled in Virginia.

He holds a Master in Science in Electrical Engineering and a Master of Science in Engineering Administration from George Washington University.

After graduate he worked at the United States Department of the Navy before becoming a diplomat in 1991.

Diplomatic career
An Le began his diplomatic career at the Embassy in China (Beijing 1991 to 1994) and moved to other postings in Asia and Europe:
 Japan (Tokyo 1994 to 1997)
 Malaysia (Kuala Lumpur 1997-2001)
 Singapore (2001-2004) 
 South Korea (Seoul 2004 to 2007).

He served as the Minister Counselor for Management in the U.S. Embassy in Paris, France from 2007 to 2010.

References

External links
Vietnam first 2 clinics to attain global standards
US Consul General to visit University of Can Tho, VN

1954 births
Living people
American consuls
George Washington University School of Engineering and Applied Science alumni
American Buddhists
Vietnamese Buddhists
People from Tiền Giang province